Theretra celata is a moth of the  family Sphingidae. It is known from the Moluccas east to Vanuatu and south to Australia. It is often treated as a subspecies of Theretra clotho.

The length of the forewings is 35–42 mm for males and 41.5–48.9 mm for females. It is similar to Theretra clotho clotho, but overall tone generally more yellowish. The forewing underside has a blackish-brown area which is generally less extended than in Theretra clotho clotho. The hindwing upperside has a buff median band that is broader than in Theretra clotho clotho and extended more or less to the costal margin.

Subspecies
Theretra celata celata
Theretra celata babarensis Eitschberger, 2005 (Moluccas)

References

Theretra
Moths described in 1877